The battle of Billot tower took place in 1703, during the war of the Camisards, when Huguenot rebels led by Jean Cavalier were ambushed in Bagard by Royalist troops.

Background 

In late 1703, Camisard leader Jean Cavalier decided to launch an offensive against the Florentines, a Catholic militia mainly based in Saint-Florent-sur-Auzonnet, in response to Catholic attempts to suppress the Camisards. Teaming up with fellow rebel Salomon Couderc, he organized a troop of 1,200 men. Cavalier and his forces marched down to the Billot Tower, a castle located in the Bagard commune, between Alès and Anduze.

A nearby miller who overheard the plan sent a message to the marquis of Montrevel that thousands of Camisards had set up camp near the Billot tower. On the evening of April 29, Montrevel told his lieutenant-general, de Planque, to attack the rebels. Leaving Alès at 9:00 PM with 800 infantry and 200 dragoons , Cavalier encountered the Camisards at 11:00 PM.

Battle 
The advancing royalist regiments included Marines, Royal-Comtois, Irish Legion, a Swiss regiment, and many others. The dragoons were split into three columns as they crossed the Gardon river to get to the tower. Lieutenant-general de Planque arrived at a road near Anduze with 400 footmen as the third column passed through Sommières. De Planque's column was the first to see combat after it ambushed a band of Camisards near Vermagtet farm. A Protestant vanguard tried to slow the troops down but failed. Cavalier assembled 400 soldiers outside the castle's gate as others tried to get inside the structure. Cavalier led an assault on the gate as the battle grew stronger. Seeing the grenadiers retreating, the Camisards took the opportunity to evacuate the castle, leaving behind about forty people who they couldn't rescue. Cavalier attacked the gate two more times but was driven back by the castle's defenders. Somewhere between three and four o'clock in the morning, the Camisards fled the castle to Saint Bénezet. The remaining rebels kept up the fight for eight more hours until grenadiers set fire to the building with their grenade. Only three Camisards managed to survive ; the others perished in the flames.

Casualties 
The attackers lost two captains, one a lieutenant and the other a  second-lieutenant. Seven officers from the Irish Legion were wounded, 26 grenadiers killed and 29 soldiers were injured. According to government estimates, 134 Camisards were killed on the first day, and 300 more died during the burning of Billot tower. Jean Cavalier estimated he had lost around a hundred soldiers, additionally claiming that over 1,000 of the opposing side's soldiers had been killed or wounded. The historian Pierre Rolland described Cavalier's casualty estimates to be an exaggeration.

References

Sources 
 

1703 in France
Ambushes in Europe
Billot tower
Billot tower
Building and structure fires in France
War of the Camisards
Billot tower
History of Gard